Pavel Ivanovich Novitsky (1888—1971) was a Russian Empire and Soviet photographer.

He was the photographer of the SS Chelyuskin steamship arctic expedition. For his heroism during the sinking of the Chelyuskin he was awarded the Order of the Red Star (1934).

References

1888 births
1971 deaths
Photographers from the Russian Empire
Soviet photographers